The Birkenhead Bridge is a bascule bridge in Adelaide, Australia that crosses the Port River.

In February 1938, the Government of South Australia awarded a contract to Adelaide Construction to build a bridge across the Port River from Birkenhead to Port Adelaide, with Perry Engineering contracted to supply the steelwork. The bridge was opened on 14 December 1940 by Governor Malcolm Barclay-Harvey. It was one of only four bascule bridges in the world adapted for use by trolleybuses.

In 2014, two of the four road lanes were converted into pedestrian and bike paths. In 2020, the timber road deck has been replaced with fibre reinforced polymer and the timber footpath with aluminium.

The bridge is listed on the South Australian Heritage Register.

References

External links

Bascule bridges
Bridges completed in 1940
Buildings and structures in Adelaide
Lefevre Peninsula
Road bridges in South Australia
South Australian Heritage Register
1940 establishments in Australia